Gird (also known as Gopasetra in ancient times, or Gwalior region later) is a region of the Madhya Pradesh state in central India. It includes the districts of Bhind, Gwalior, Morena, Sheopur, and Shivpuri. Gwalior is the largest city in the region, and its historic center.

The Chambal and Yamuna rivers form the northwestern and northern boundaries of the region. Hadoti region of Rajasthan lies to the southwest, Malwa region of Madhya Pradesh lies to the south, Bundelkhand region of Madhya Pradesh and Uttar Pradesh lies to the east and Braj region of Uttar Pradesh lies to the North.

Geography
The region is semi-arid characterized by black less fertile soil, rainfall of 200 to 300 mm/year, and winter temperatures that sometimes drop below 5 degrees Celsius. Major crops in the region include soya bean, gram, and wheat and under-assured irrigation, and guava, ber, aonla, and custardapple.

History
See: Gwalior state
See: Dholpur State

Regions of Madhya Pradesh